Frank J. Washabaugh (July 2, 1849 – May 29, 1902) was an American politician and jurist.

Career
Born in Bedford, Pennsylvania, he graduated from Lafayette College. His father Daniel Washabaugh served in the Pennsylvania General Assembly. He then moved to Yankton, Dakota Territory and then to Rapid City, Dakota Territory where he practiced law. In 1882, Washabaugh was elected to the Dakota Territorial Council. In 1889, Washabaugh was elected to the South Dakota State Senate from Deadwood, South Dakota, as a Republican. In 1898, he was elected county judge for Lawrence County, South Dakota. He died in Baltimore, Maryland where he had gone for medical treatment.

Legacy
The former Washabaugh County, South Dakota was named after Frank J. Washabaugh.

Notes

External links

1849 births
1902 deaths
People from Bedford, Pennsylvania
People from Deadwood, South Dakota
Politicians from Rapid City, South Dakota
Lafayette College alumni
South Dakota state court judges
Members of the Dakota Territorial Legislature
19th-century American politicians
Republican Party South Dakota state senators
19th-century American judges